During 1984–85 season Lanerossi Vicenza played its fourth consecutive season in Serie C1 after relegation from 1980–81 Serie B.

Summary 

The squad reaches the second spot with 45 points, clinching the promotion to Serie B after won a tie-breaker match against Piacenza Calcio a result that was object of Judicial investigation, included in the Totonero 1986 scandal.

18-yr-old playmaker Roberto Baggio scored 12 goals in 25 matches played and was transferred out after Fiorentina bought him in 2 800 million of Italian lire (€1.39 million) on 3 May 1985 in spite of being injured only two days later while playing against Arrigo Sacchi's Rimini.

Squad

Competitions

Serie C1

League table

Matches

Tie-breaker match

Coppa Italia

Group stage

Coppa Italia Serie C

Round of 32

Eightfinals

Statistics

Squad statistics

Players statistics

References 

Vicenza Calcio
L.R. Vicenza seasons